Carmelo Angulo Mendoza (born May 23, 1980 in Cobija) is a retired Bolivian football midfielder.

Club career
Angulo had two spells in Wilstermann. During the first period with the aviadores, he won a national championship. Subsequently, he would also play for Independiente Petrolero, Aurora, Bolívar, Blooming and The Strongest.

International career
Angulo also played for the Bolivia national team between 2004 and 2005, appearing in 7 games.

Honours
Liga de Fútbol Profesional Boliviano: 4
 2000 (Wilstermann), 2005 AD, 2006 C (Bolívar), 2008 C (The Strongest)

References

External links
 
 

1980 births
Living people
People from Cobija
Association football midfielders
Bolivian footballers
Bolivia international footballers
C.D. Jorge Wilstermann players
La Paz F.C. players
Club Aurora players
Club Bolívar players
Club Blooming players
The Strongest players
Municipal Real Mamoré players
Nacional Potosí players